Westlands Water District is a water district in central California, a local-government entity formed in 1952, that holds long-term contracts for water supplied by the Central Valley Project and the California State Water Project.

It is the largest agricultural water district in the US, and provides water to farms in an area of approximately 600,000 acres (2,400 km²) in Fresno County and Kings County in the San Joaquin Valley of central California. Its headquarters are in Fresno.

Background
Westlands is the largest agricultural water district in the United States. Farms in Westlands make up less than one-tenth of the 6.9 million acres of farmland in California. It has been the focal point for many controversial water issues in California because of its size. Roughly 600 farmers own land, many of them are large (25,000 acres) but many also small.

Economical significance of district agriculture
Farms within Westlands produce approximately $1 billion worth of food and fiber per year, more than 20 percent of the agricultural output of Fresno County, per the Fresno County Farm Bureau. That averages out to about $1,700 of gross revenues per acre. Despite this apparent productivity, a 2008 study by Oxfam and the Rockefeller foundation found that the 20th U.S. Congressional District is the poorest congressional district in the United States. Westlands water district farmers receive a triple subsidy- cheap water, USDA crop subsidies, and below-market electricity.

Legislative history

The Reclamation Act of 1902 required that farmers live on their land, because Westlands had many absent landowners at the time of federal contracting, and that they only receive water for 160 acres. From 1915 until the mid forties water from deep wells irrigated the land and lowered the water table.

In 1942, the 'Westside Landowners Association' formed to help finance studies of developing an alternative water supply for the west side. They contracted with the Bureau of Reclamation, to determine if surface water from the Central Valley Project (CVP) through an off-stream site at San Luis could reach west side lands. 
 
In 1952, owners of 400,000 acres of west side land successfully petitioned the Fresno County Board of Supervisors to form a water district.

In 1961, the State of California signed a contract with the federal government for federal construction of the San Luis Unit of the CVP, including a drain, followed by its construction over 6 years and operation since 1968. The government had agreed to build a drain as well, well aware that the irrigation in parts of Westlands would saturate the root zone. Due to environmental concerns and budget constraints only the first part of the San Luis Drain was completed. The half-completed drain created Kesterson Wildlife Refuge.

Congress passed the 'Reclamation Reform Act of 1982', which increased allowable irrigated land to 960 acres (3.9 km²) and struck the requirement that west side landowners remain near their lands. In 1985 the drain had to be closed by court order due to high levels of heavy metals, such as selenium, boron, chromium, molybdenum and salts in the drained water, violating environmental laws . The soil in the upslope regions of the district contains "extraordinarily elevated concentrations of selenium, boron, chromium, molybdenum, and extremely high concentrations of various salts that disrupt the normal ionic balance of the aquatic system."
The California drought, beginning in 1987, led to reductions in surface water delivery.

In 2011, lawyer David L. Bernhardt and the Colorado-based law firm Brownstein Hyatt Farber Schreck filed a lawsuit for Westlands that "sought to force the feds to make good on a commitment to build a multibillion-dollar system to dispose of the poisoned water" resulting from toxic irrigation in the Westlands district. Later, through the 2017 bill HR 1769, Westlands agreed to drop the lawsuit in exchange for forgiven debt and long-term access to water from Central Valley Project facilities. In April 2017, the House Natural Resources Committee approved the settlement, but rejected an amendment that would have "barred former Westlands officials or lobbyists — meaning Bernhardt — from working on the drainage issue for five years." Through Brownstein Hyatt Farber Schreck, Bernhardt also represented Westlands Water District in "a lawsuit that sought to undo court-imposed protections for endangered salmon in the Sacramento-San Joaquin Delta."

In February 2020, 75 project customers, including the Westlands, received permanent federal water contracts for the Central Valley Project.

Lobbying activities
Up until 2006 the Westlands Water District had spent less than $100,000 annually on lobbying. In 2006 it increased to $208,000, to pay two firms, and $266,000 in 2009 to pay three lobbying groups. In 2012 lobbying expenses further increased to $370,000, to pay three groups, and in 2013 to $600,000 for 5 lobbying groups and their 9 lobbyists. Until the end of 2016, David L. Bernhardt was both an attorney and lobbyist for Westlands. However, in November 2016 he delisted himself as a lobbyist, to avoid "running afoul of the new president's ban on lobbyists joining his administration." By April 2017, Bernhardt remained on a $20,000-a-month retainer with Westlands.

See also
San Joaquin River
Central Valley Project
California Water Wars
Water in California
Sacramento-San Joaquin Valley Emergency Water Delivery Act (H.R. 3964; 113th Congress)

References

External links
Westlands Water District website
Land Retirement Analysis of Economic Impacts (Full Report)
 Law.ggu.edu: "Reaping Riches in a Wretched Region: Subsidized Industrial Farming and Its Link to Perpetual Poverty"

Water management authorities in California
California State Water Project
Central Valley Project
Irrigation Districts of the United States
Government of Fresno County, California
Government of Kings County, California
Agriculture in California
San Joaquin Valley
1952 establishments in California
Government agencies established in 1952